= Amalactus aterrimus =

Scientific classification
- Kingdom: Animalia
- Phylum: Arthropoda
- Clade: Pancrustacea
- Class: Insecta
- Order: Coleoptera
- Suborder: Polyphaga
- Infraorder: Cucujiformia
- Family: Curculionidae
- Genus: Amalactus
- Species: A. aterrimus

Binomial name
- Amalactus aterrimus Boheman, 1843

Species of beetle

Amalactus aterrimus is a species of beetle from the family Curculionidae.

== Range ==
South and North America, occurring in Argentina, Suriname, Venezuela, and in Central America.

== Body structure ==
The body is strongly elongated. The elytra have distinct, dense, thick, elongated stippling. The Pronotum is almost round in outline, densely and finely punctated on the sides and smooth in the central part.

The entire body is black and shiny.
